Sanju Sivram is an Indian actor who predominantly appears in Malayalam cinema, who made his debut in 2013 movie Nee Ko Njaa Cha.

He is best known for his roles in  Nee Ko Njaa Cha (2013), 1983 (2014), Hello Namasthe (2016). He made his Telugu debut through Raktham directed by Rajesh Touchriver.

Career 
Sanju Sivram made his silver screen debut with the Malayalam film Nee Ko Njaa Cha, directed by Gireesh. He has also acted in films like Bharya Athra Pora, 1983, Monsoon Mangoes,  Beware of Dogs. His portrayal of the character Babukuttan was well appreciated in 2014 hit movie 1983.

Hello Namasthe. He played the male lead along with Vinay Forrt in the light hearted film Hello Namasthe, which revolves around the theme of friendship.

Sanju also appeared in a few short films, A Friday and Maniyara. etc.

Filmography

Films

Television

References

External links 
 
 
Sivramsanju on Twitter

Living people
Male actors in Malayalam cinema
Indian male film actors
Male actors from Kolkata
1984 births
21st-century Indian male actors
Indian male television actors
Male actors in Malayalam television